Frances Elizabeth Wynne (1836 – 13 January 1907) was a prolific amateur artist who sketched many scenes in Britain and Europe. Wynne toured Europe on several occasions between  the 1850s and 1900. She was the daughter of Charles Griffith-Wynne M.P.

Family
Wynne was the youngest child of Charles Griffith-Wynne who owned the Voelas and Cefn Amlwch estates in Denbighshire. The family were descended from a cadet branch of the Earls of Aylesford. Frances' older sister Charlotte married  John Robert Godley and is notable for her letter writing and community leadership in the colony of New Zealand. Frances Elizabeth never married and died in 1907.

Sketch books
Frances Elizabeth travelled widely with her family in England, Wales and on the European tour circuit. She was a prolific amateur artist and about 1850 images dated 1854-1901 survive in the collections of the National Library of Wales. Her sketches ranged from fantasy art and satirical observations to classic portraiture. The collection includes a sketch of Queen Victoria at the opera in 1857 with King Leopold I and other European Royalty.

Gallery

References 

1835 births
1907 deaths
19th-century Welsh women artists
Gentry families
People from Denbighshire